Irreligion in Peru refers to atheism, deism, religious skepticism, secularism, and humanism in Peruvian society. According to article 2 of the Peruvian Constitution: "No person shall be persecuted on the basis of his ideas or beliefs". According to the 2017 Peruvian Census data, 1,180,361 Peruvians or 5.1% of the population older than 12 years old describes themselves as being irreligious, but some sources put this number higher at 8.2%.

The irreligious population is predominantly urban (85,5% live in cities) and males (61,4% are male), and most are young people within the ages between 18 and 29 (40,4%). Only 11,8% of irreligious people are 50 years old or older.

Even though Peru is considered to be a Secular state, according to article 50 of the Peruvian Constitution the subject of Roman Catholicism is mandatory in Peruvian public schools. Many non-profit organizations promote the removal of the subject of Roman Catholicism in public schools, such as the Secular Humanist Society of Peru, or the Association of Peruvian Atheists.

See also 

 Religion in Peru
 Demographics of Peru
 Irreligion in Latin America
 Irreligion in Mexico
 Irreligion in Uruguay

References 

Peruvian culture
Peru